Miller Ice Rise is an ice rise nearly  long and  wide at the ice front (1974) of the Wordie Ice Shelf,  west-northwest of the Triune Peaks, in southern Marguerite Bay, Antarctica. It was surveyed by the Falkland Islands Dependencies Survey in 1948–49, and was photographed from the air by the U.S. Navy in 1966.  The feature was named, in 1977, by the Advisory Committee on Antarctic Names for Richard Miller, a U.S. Navy chief radioman at Palmer Station in the winter party of 1968.

References

Ice rises of Graham Land
Fallières Coast